Stachyopsis is a genus of plants in the family Lamiaceae, first described in 1923. The genus is native to Central Asia.

Species
 Stachyopsis lamiiflora (Rupr.) Popov & Vved. - Kazakhstan, Kyrgyzstan, Xinjiang
 Stachyopsis maleolens (Rech.f.) Hedge - Afghanistan
 Stachyopsis marrubioides (Regel) Ikonn.-Gal. - Kazakhstan, Xinjiang
 Stachyopsis oblongata (Schrenk) Popov & Vved. - Afghanistan, Uzbekistan, Tajikistan, Kazakhstan, Kyrgyzstan, Xinjiang

References

Lamiaceae
Lamiaceae genera